Patterson-UTI Energy provides land drilling and pressure pumping services, directional drilling, rental equipment and technology to clients in the United States and western Canada.

Patterson-UTI Companies include:

 Patterson-UTI Drilling
 Universal Pressure Pumping
 MS Directional
 Great Plains Oilfield Rental
 Warrior Rig Technologies
 Current Power Solutions
 Superior QC

History
Patterson Drilling Company was founded in 1978 by Cloyce Talbott and Glenn Patterson.

In 2001, Patterson Drilling acquired UTI Energy and renamed the company Patterson-UTI Energy.

In September 2014, the company acquired Texas-based pressure pumping assets.

In September 2016, the company acquired Warrior Rig.

In April 2017, the company acquired Seventy Seven Energy.  The deal included Seventy Seven's affiliates: Great Plains Oilfield Rental, Nomac Drilling (now part of Patterson-UTI Drilling), and Performance Technologies (now part of Universal Pressure Pumping).

In October 2017, the company acquired MS Energy Services (now MS Directional).

In February 2018, the company acquired Superior QC, a provider of software used to improve the accuracy of horizontal wellbore placement.

In October 2018, the company acquired Current Power Solutions, Inc.

In October 2021, Patterson-UTI announced that it completed the acquisition of Pioneer Energy Services.

References

Companies listed on the Nasdaq
Drilling rig operators
Companies based in Houston
Service companies of the United States
Business services companies established in 1978
1978 establishments in Texas